Kyle Tress  (born May 29, 1981) is an American Olympic skeleton racer who competed from 2002 until 2017. He placed 25th in the 2011 FIBT World Championships in Konigssee, Germany. His best World Cup finish was 5th in the men's event at St. Moritz, Switzerland on January 11, 2013, and  Lake Placid, New York, on November 5, 2012. On January 18, 2014, Tress was named to the 2014 Olympic team. His last World Cup race was in February 2017, at Igls, where he finished in 19th place; the following season, Tress began coaching the Japanese national team.

Personal life
A native of New Jersey, Tress graduated in 1999 from South Hunterdon Regional High School.

Tress lives and trains in Lake Placid, New York, at the United States Olympic Training Center.

He will be attending Yale University in the fall of 2018.

References

External links 
 
 
 Skeletonsport.com profile

1981 births
American male skeleton racers
Living people
Olympic skeleton racers of the United States
People from Lambertville, New Jersey
Skeleton racers at the 2014 Winter Olympics